Richard Thomas Olson (born November 18, 1949) is an American politician. He served in the Michigan House of Representatives from 2011 to 2013.

Raised in the Upper Peninsula area of Michigan, Olson is an alumnus of Michigan State University and Stanford Law School and is a lawyer by profession. He previously worked for the Washington State Legislature and Governor of Washington's office. Olson was elected to the Michigan House of Representatives as a Republican in 2010 and served until 2013. In 2014, he was severely injured after being struck by a vehicle while cycling near Saline Township, Michigan, where he resided.

He retired to Prior Lake, Minnesota with his wife in 2015. In 2019, he announced his intent to challenge Angie Craig for Minnesota's 2nd congressional district in 2020. Olson is married to Linda and has two children.

References

Living people
Republican Party members of the Michigan House of Representatives
1949 births
Minnesota Republicans
Michigan State University alumni
Stanford Law School alumni
21st-century American politicians